The Lamborghini Jalpa is a sports car produced by the Italian automotive manufacturer Lamborghini from 1981 until 1988. It debuted at the 1981 Geneva Motor Show alongside the Lamborghini LM001 concept off-road vehicle. The Jalpa was the last Lamborghini to use a V8 engine until the Urus SUV in 2018.

Overview
The Jalpa was a development of the earlier Silhouette intended to fill a role as a more "affordable" Lamborghini, being much less expensive than the flagship Countach and being also designed by Bertone. 
Compared to the Countach, the Jalpa was much easier to drive, having better visibility and being more tractable in heavy traffic and at slow speeds, although reviewers have noted that it had a heavy steering and accelerator.

Name

The name Jalpa Kandachia came from a famous breed of fighting bulls, a tradition later followed with the Gallardo.

Engine

The Jalpa was fitted with a  double overhead camshaft version of the V8 engine used in the Silhouette on which it was based. Fuel flow was managed by four twin-barrel down-draught Weber 42 DCNF carburetors.

Performance
The performance of the Jalpa was comparable to the entry-level Ferrari 328 which itself was based on the older Ferrari 308.

Classic & Sports Car magazine quoted a  acceleration time of 6.8 seconds and a 0–161 km/h time of 16 seconds for the Jalpa, while Car and Driver reported a 0–60 mph acceleration time of 5.8 seconds.

Revisions and end of production
When the car was sold in 1981, the plastic components (bumpers, air intakes and engine cover) were black, and the car carried over the rectangular taillights of the Silhouette along with the targa top body style. This was changed in 1984 when round taillights were fitted and the black plastic parts were replaced by parts in body colour. A rear wing, as with the Countach, was optional.

In 1988, after falling sales, the new owners, Chrysler, decided to end Jalpa production despite its being Lamborghini's second most successful V8 car to date (after the Urraco), having sold 410 units.

In popular culture
A black Jalpa was featured prominently in the 1985 film Rocky IV, driven by Sylvester Stallone portraying Rocky Balboa. The car had a Pennsylvania license plate of "SOTHPAW", referencing Balboa's fighting stance.

References

External links

History and specifications of the Jalpa

Jalpa
Sports cars
Rear mid-engine, rear-wheel-drive vehicles
Cars introduced in 1981
Cars discontinued in 1988